Sneekes is a surname. Notable people with the surname include:

Melissa Sneekes (born 1983), Dutch beauty pageant contestant 
Richard Sneekes (born 1968), Dutch footballer

Dutch-language surnames